The Princeton Daily Clarion is a newspaper circulating Tuesday through Friday mornings, two days a week in Princeton and Gibson County, Indiana, United States. The newspaper was founded in 1846 as a weekly edition, and is considered the oldest continuously operating business in Gibson County. It is one of two newspapers in Gibson County. Its website is www.pdclarion.com. Previous owner Brehm Communications sold the paper to Paxton in September 2016. Other area newspapers under the Paxton Media Group umbrella are the Hometown Register in Southeastern Illinois; Vincennes Sun-Commercial, Dubois County Herald, Warrick Standard, Paoli-Springs Valley News-Herald, Spencer County Journal-Democrat and Perry County News in Indiana and Owensboro Messenger-Inquirer and Paducah Sun in Kentucky.

References

External links
 

Newspapers published in Indiana
Newspapers of Southwestern Indiana